Pervanadyl is a pale yellow oxycation of vanadium(V). It is the predominant vanadium(V) species in acidic solutions with pH between 0 and 2, and its salts are formed by protonation of vanadium(V) oxide in such solutions:
 (K = )
The ion can form a complex with a single aminopolycarboxylate ligand, or with tridentate Schiff base ligands.

The / redox couple is used at the cathode of the vanadium redox battery. The standard reduction potential of this couple is +1.00 V.

See also
 Vanadate, vanadium(V) oxyanions

References

Vanadyl compounds
Vanadium(V) compounds
Oxycations